

A
 Alexander Nevsky Lavra
 Alexander-Svirsky Monastery
 Alexeevsky Monastery
 Antonievo-Siysky Monastery
 Arkazhsky Monastery
 Ascension Convent

B
 Bogoyavlensky Monastery (Kostroma)
 Bogoyavlensky Monastery (Uglich)
 Borisoglebsky Monastery (Borisoglebsky)
 Borisoglebsky Monastery (Dmitrov)

C
 Chernigovsky Skit
 Chrysostom Monastery
 Chudov Monastery
 Conception Convent

D
 Danilov Monastery
 Donskoy Monastery

E
 Epiphany Monastery

F
 Ferapontov Monastery

G
 Ganina Yama
 Goritsky Monastery (Goritsy)
 Goritsky Monastery (Pereslavl-Zalessky)

H
 Holy Trinity Monastery (Jordanville, New York)

I
 Ipatiev Monastery

J
 Joseph-Volokolamsk Monastery

K
 Kamenny Monastery
 Khutyn Monastery
 Kirillo-Belozersky Monastery
 Kizichesky Monastery
 Klobukov Monastery
 Konevsky Monastery
 Korennaya Pustyn Monastery (Korennaya Pustyn)
 Kozheozersky Monastery
 Krestny Monastery at Kiy Island
 Krutitsy
 Krypetsky Monastery

L
 Luzhetsky Monastery

M
 Makaryev Monastery
 Marfo-Mariinsky Convent
 Monastery of Our Lady of Kazan (Tambov)

N
 New Jerusalem Monastery
 Nikolo-Babaysky Monastery
 Nikolo-Korelsky Monastery
 Nikolo-Perervinsky Monastery
 Nikolo-Ugresh monastery
 Novodevichy Convent
 Novospassky Monastery

O
 Optina Monastery

P
 Pafnutievo-Borovsky Monastery
 Pavlo-Obnorsky Monastery
 Pechenga Monastery
 Pokrovsky Monastery (Moscow)
 Pokrovsky Monastery (Suzdal)
 Pskovo-Pechorsky Monastery
 Pühtitsa Convent

R
 Rizopolozhensky Monastery
 Rozhdestvensky monastery (Moscow)
 Rozhdestvensky monastery (Vladimir)

S
 Sanaksar Monastery
 Savvino-Storozhevsky Monastery
 Serafimo-Diveevsky Monastery
 Simonov Monastery
 Solovetsky Monastery
 Spaso-Borodinsky Monastery
 Sretensky Monastery (Kashin)
 Sretensky Monastery (Gorohovets)
 Sretensky Monastery (Moscow)
 Sretensky Monastery (Pereslavl-Zalessky)
 St. Andronik Monastery
 Svensky Monastery

T

 Tikhvinsky Monastery (Tikhvin)
 Transfiguration Monastery (Staraya Russa)
 Troitse-Danilov Monastery
 Troitse-Sergiyeva Lavra
 Troitsky Boldin Monastery
 Troitsky Makariev Monastery

V
 Valaam Monastery
 Vysokopetrovsky Monastery
 Vysotsky Monastery

Y
 Yelizarov Monastery
 Yuriev Monastery

Z
 Zaikonospassky monastery

See also
List of Serbian Orthodox monasteries

Russian Orthodox monasteries
Russian orthodox